Kate Germano is an American author and a former lieutenant colonel in the United States Marine Corps.

Germano is known for her 2018 book Fight Like a Girl, which explores systemic gender bias against women in U.S. Marine Corps' recruiting and training policies.

Life 
Germano graduated from the U.S. Marine Corps Command and Staff College. She served 20 years in the Marines. In 2015, she was relieved of command after she challenged Marine Corps leadership about systemic gender bias in the recruiting and training of women. She is the former chief operations officer of the Service Women's Action Network. In 2016, Germano founded Cassandra-Helenus Partners, LLC, an organization development and change leadership consulting firm. Since Germano retired from the Marines, the Corps has implemented some of her then-controversial training methods.

Works
 
  Fight like a Girl Amherst, New York : Prometheus Books, 2018. ,

References

External links 

Living people
Year of birth missing (living people)
United States Marine Corps officers
Female United States Marine Corps personnel
Marine Corps University alumni
American military writers
21st-century American women